Carlos Edriel Poquiz Yulo (born February 16, 2000) is a Filipino artistic gymnast who has won multiple medals at the World Artistic Gymnastics Championships.
He is the first Filipino and the first male Southeast Asian gymnast to medal at the World Artistic Gymnastics Championships with his floor exercise bronze medal finish in 2018, and the first ever gold medal for the Philippines in 2019 on the same apparatus. This performance also qualified him to the 2020 Summer Olympics in Tokyo.

Early life and education

Carlos Edriel Poquiz Yulo was born on February 16, 2000 to Mark Andrew Yulo and Angelica Yulo in Manila, Philippines, and was raised in Leveriza Street, Malate. He is the second of five children; one of his younger siblings, Drew, is also a gymnast. Yulo grew up watching Filipino gymnasts train and compete at the Rizal Memorial Sports Complex in Malate.

Yulo attended Aurora A. Quezon Elementary School for his primary education in Manila, where he was already training for the Philippine National Games as part of the National Capital Region's gymnastics team. Through the support of the Gymnastics Association of the Philippines, he was able to attend Adamson University in Ermita for his secondary education.

In 2016, Yulo accepted an offer by the Japan Olympic Association to train in Japan under a scholarship program. Caloy had to move to Japan, and that's where he started his further education at Teikyo University in Itabashi.
Currently, Yulo is fluent in the Japanese language.

Not to mention, he commenced his study in 2013 and is devoted to a degree in literature.

Career

Senior
 In his Gymnastics World Cup debut in the 2018 series, he consistently performed well, winning a medal in the Melbourne, Baku, Doha, and Cottbus events. At the men's floor exercise event at the 2018 Asian Games, he scored highest in the qualification phase but failed to secure a medal after finishing 7th in the final.

At the 2018 World Artistic Gymnastics Championships in Doha, Yulo advanced to the all-around and floor exercise finals. He won bronze in the floor exercise  becoming the first Filipino and the first male Southeast Asian gymnast to win a medal at the championships. At the 2019 World Artistic Gymnastics Championships in Stuttgart, Yulo claimed gold in the floor exercise finals making history as the first Filipino world champion in artistic gymnastics.

By advancing to the final round of the all-around event of the 2019 World Artistic Gymnastics Championships, Yulo secured qualification to compete for the Philippines at the 2020 Summer Olympics in Tokyo.

At the 2019 Southeast Asian Games, Yulo finished on the podium in every event winning gold in the all-around and floor exercise and silver in the pommel horse, still rings, vault, parallel bars, and horizontal bar.

Yulo reportedly trains for six to eight hours a day, six days per week.

He clinched his first-ever Asian Championship title when he clinched the gold medal at the floor exercise of the 2022 Asian Artistic Gymnastics Championships in Doha after taking silver in the individual all-around. He followed it up with gold medals in the vault and parallel bars events.

Competitive history

Awards 
 President's Award, 2020 Philippine Sportswriters Association Awards

References

External links

 Carlos Yulo Profile

Living people
2000 births
Sportspeople from Manila
Filipino male artistic gymnasts
Gymnasts at the 2018 Asian Games
Asian Games competitors for the Philippines
Teikyo University alumni
Filipino expatriates in Japan
People from Malate, Manila
Southeast Asian Games gold medalists for the Philippines
Southeast Asian Games silver medalists for the Philippines
Competitors at the 2019 Southeast Asian Games
Competitors at the 2021 Southeast Asian Games
Southeast Asian Games medalists in gymnastics
Medalists at the World Artistic Gymnastics Championships
World champion gymnasts
Gymnasts at the 2020 Summer Olympics
Olympic gymnasts of the Philippines